Val-d'Issoire is a commune in the Haute-Vienne department of western France. The municipality was established on 1 January 2016 and consists of the former communes of Bussière-Boffy and Mézières-sur-Issoire.

See also 
Communes of the Haute-Vienne department

References 

Communes of Haute-Vienne